8th Vitranc Cup was an alpine skiing competition, held between 16–17 February 1969 in Kranjska Gora, SR Slovenia, Yugoslavia. They were hosting two FIS World Cup events.

Official results

Giant slalom 
On 16 February, giant slalom for World Cup was held, first time in two runs in Kranjska Gora.

References

External links
 

International sports competitions hosted by Yugoslavia
1969 in Yugoslav sport
International sports competitions hosted by Slovenia
Alpine skiing competitions
Alpine skiing in Slovenia
1969 in Slovenia